The 2016 Vuelta a Murcia was the 32nd professional edition of the Vuelta a Murcia cycle race and was held on 13 February 2016. The race started in San Javier and finished in Murcia. The race was won by Philippe Gilbert.

General classification

References

2016
2016 in road cycling
2016 in Spanish sport